Tootia is a 1998 Iranian drama film written by Alireza Davood Nejad and directed by Iraj Ghaderi.

Plot 
Shaghayegh (Shaghayegh Farahani), the CEO of a cooperative, needs more money to build a specialized pediatric medical complex. Shaghayegh's husband, Siavash (Fariborz Arabnia), will have taking a doctoral exam, But Shaghayegh leaves the housework to him. Siavash protests, The dispute escalates and Shaghayegh angrily goes to her father's house. Siavash takes care of Tootia (Aida Motallebi), But one day, Tootia falls from a height for fear of his father and suffers from a disability and ...

Cast 
 Fariborz Arabnia
 Shaghayegh Farahani
 Afsaneh Bayegan
 Behzad Farahani
 Afsaneh Naseri
 Aida Motallebi
 Ali Sartipi
 Armin Vareszadeh
 Fatemeh Taheri
 Morteza NikKhah

Awards and nominations
17nd Fajr International Film Festival:
 Nominated: Best Actress in a Supporting Role (Aida Motallebi)

References

External links

Tootia at Filimo

1998 films
1990s Persian-language films
Iranian drama films
1998 drama films